The Easton–Phillipsburg Toll Bridge is a modified Pennsylvania (Petit) through truss bridge that carries U.S. Route 22 over the Delaware River. The bridge is located between Easton, Pennsylvania and Phillipsburg, New Jersey in the Lehigh Valley. 

The Easton-Phillipsburg Toll Bridge opened on January 14, 1938 and is operated by the Delaware River Joint Toll Bridge Commission.

Features

There are  concrete pedestrian sidewalks outside the trusses on each side. The bridge is the 9th-longest (main span) simple truss and 9th-longest (main span) steel truss in the United States. When it was constructed in 1938, the bridge was the longest steel truss in the United States, a distinction it held for 19 years.

Tolls
The toll plaza collects only westbound lanes going into Pennsylvania, and includes the E-ZPass system. As of April 11, 2021, the toll rate per car is $3.00, or $1.25 if E-ZPass is used.

See also 
 List of crossings of the Delaware River

References

External links 

Official website

1938 establishments in New Jersey
1938 establishments in Pennsylvania
Bridges completed in 1938
Bridges in Northampton County, Pennsylvania
Bridges in Warren County, New Jersey
Bridges of the United States Numbered Highway System
Bridges over the Delaware River
Delaware River Joint Toll Bridge Commission
Interstate vehicle bridges in the United States
Phillipsburg, New Jersey
Plate girder bridges in the United States
Pratt truss bridges in the United States
Road bridges in New Jersey
Road bridges in Pennsylvania
Steel bridges in the United States
Toll bridges in New Jersey
Toll bridges in Pennsylvania
U.S. Route 22